The 1971–72 La Liga was the 41st season since its establishment. The season started on September 4, 1971, and finished on May 14, 1972. It was played by 18 clubs after the expansion from the previous season.

Team locations

League table

Results table

Pichichi Trophy

References 
 La Liga 1971-1972
 Primera División 1971/72
 Futbolme.com
 All rounds in La Liga 1971-72
 List of La Liga Champions

External links 
  Official LFP Site

La Liga seasons
1971–72 in Spanish football leagues
Spain